Siddheswari Boys' Higher Secondary School is one of the oldest public schools in Dhaka. It was established in 1933. It is in Ramna, one of the most important and largest thanas of Dhaka.

History 

The number of students began to fall starting in the 1990s, and in 2000 the school lacked students and qualified teachers. In 2000 around 19 students appeared at the SSC board examination. In 2010 the school had 20 teachers.

Extracurricular activities 
The school has a dedicated sports teacher. Each year it arranges cultural activities in the student farewell ceremony for those who will attend the SSC examination. The school also participates in many activities such as parade, cricket and football tournaments.

Achievements 
Siddheswari Boys' Higher Secondary School became the Ramna Thana champion in the inter-school football tournament in 2000.

See also 
 Education in Bangladesh
 List of schools in Bangladesh

References 

Schools in Dhaka District
Educational institutions established in 1933
1933 establishments in India
Boys' schools in Bangladesh